Gretchen L. Matthews (born 1973) is a mathematician specializing in algebraic coding theory. She is a professor of mathematics at Virginia Tech.

Education and career
Matthews graduated from Oklahoma State University in 1995, majoring in mathematics. She completed her Ph.D. in mathematics at Louisiana State University in 1999. Her dissertation, Weierstrass Pairs and Minimum Distance of Goppa Codes, was supervised by Robert F. Lax.

After postdoctoral research at the University of Tennessee, she joined the Clemson University faculty in 2001, and was promoted to full professor in 2012. She moved to Virginia Tech in 2018. At Virginia Tech, she directs the cryptography and cybersecurity option of the Computational Modeling and Data Analytics program, is director of the Southwest Virginia Node of the Commonwealth Cyber Initiative, and is also affiliated with the Hume Center for National Security and Technology.

Matthews is chair of the Committee on the Participation of Women of the Mathematical Association of America for 2020–2023.

Recognition
Matthews was named a Fellow of the Association for Women in Mathematics, in the 2021 class of fellows, "for contributions to and leadership of activities to encourage girls and women to study and enjoy mathematics; for service to the profession in fostering collaborative research groups with junior faculty and postdocs; and for excellence in mentoring".

References

External links
Home page

1973 births
Living people
20th-century American mathematicians
21st-century American mathematicians
American women mathematicians
Coding theorists
Oklahoma State University alumni
Louisiana State University alumni
Clemson University faculty
Virginia Tech faculty
Fellows of the Association for Women in Mathematics
21st-century American women